Rosalva Yazmín Luna Ruiz (born c. 1981 in Los Mochis, Sinaloa) is a Mexican beauty queen who represented her country in Miss Universe 2004, placing as one of the Top 15 semifinalists.

Nuestra Belleza Mexico
Luna competed in 2003 as the delegate from Sinaloa in her country's national beauty pageant, Nuestra Belleza México, winning the competition and gaining the right to represent Mexico in Miss Universe 2004.

Miss Universe 2004
As her country's official representative to the 2004 Miss Universe pageant, held in Quito, Ecuador, Luna placed second to Miss Panama in the Best National Costume competition. On June 1, 2004, she became one of the top 15 semifinalists who competed for the Miss Universe title, giving Mexico their first placement in the pageant since Silvia Salgado in 1999.

References

External links
Official Nuestra Belleza Mexico website - Past titleholders

1980s births
Living people
Mexican beauty pageant winners
Mexican female models
Miss Universe 2004 contestants
Models from Sinaloa
Nuestra Belleza México winners
People from Los Mochis